Sir Richard Bellings (sometimes spelt Bealings) (1622 – 30 October 1716) was an Irish courtier who served as the Knight secretary to Catherine of Braganza. He was one of a number of Irish Catholics given office in England following the Restoration.

In 1662 Charles II sent Sir Richard Bellings to Rome to arrange the terms of England's conversion to Roman Catholicism.

On 1 June 1670 he was one of the signatories of the Secret Treaty of Dover for England. Others who signed it were Henry Bennet, 1st Earl of Arlington, Sir Thomas Clifford, Henry Arundell, 3rd Baron Arundell of Wardour and Jean-Baptiste Colbert for France. That secret treaty engaged Charles II to declare himself a Roman Catholic, for which Louis XIV was to pay him two millions of francs, and, in the event of anticipated disturbances in England, provide military support.

It was the signing of this treaty which effectively created an alliance with England and France and against Holland, in March 1672. This was the second Dutch War of the reign of Charles the Second.

Family

Bellings's father  Richard Bellings (1603–1677) was a lawyer and political figure in 17th century Ireland, while his mother was Margaret Butler, a daughter of Richard Butler, 3rd Viscount Mountgaret.

He married in 1671 Francis Arundell, a daughter of Sir John Arundell of Lanherne and a gentlewoman of Queen Catherine. Their son Richard took the surname Bellings-Arundell, in accordance with his Grandfather's will.

Children
 Richard Bellings-Arundell married Anne Gage, dau. of Joseph Gage of Sherborne Castle
 Helen, married Sir John Hales, 4th Baronet

Bellings was buried at St Columb Major in Cornwall. The coat of arms displayed on his headstone is described as "A cross pattée fitchée (Bealing) on an escutcheon of pretence (Arundell); impaling Arundell. Crest: Over esquire's helmet, on a wreath a demi-lion rampant, holding between its paws a cross pattée fitchée."

References

Letters Addressed from London to Sir Joseph Williamson While Plenipotentiary at the Congress of Cologne in the Years 1673 and 1674. Volume: 1. edited by, Sir Joseph Williamson - (1874).

Bibliography
 Dennehy, Coleman. Restoration Ireland: Always Settling and Never Settled. Ashgate Publishing, 2008

External links

Letters Addressed from London to Sir Joseph Williamson While Plenipotentiary at the Congress of Cologne in the Years 1673 and 1674   Vol. 1

1622 births
1716 deaths
English courtiers
History of Catholicism in England
Richard Bellings (courtier)
Burials in Cornwall
Household of Catherine of Braganza